Alert Bay Water Aerodrome  is located adjacent to Alert Bay, British Columbia, Canada. The water aerodrome is built on Cormorant Island in the Queen Charlotte Strait, between Malcolm Island and Port McNeill.

See also
Alert Bay Airport

References

Seaplane bases in British Columbia
Regional District of Mount Waddington
Registered aerodromes in British Columbia